El Vado Lake is a reservoir located in Rio Arriba County, in northern New Mexico in the southwestern United States.

The eastern shore of the lake is the El Vado Lake State Park, featuring over 100 camping and picnic sites, and two improved boat ramps.  The lake is a destination for salmon and trout fishing, as well as for boating.  Unlike nearby Heron Lake, boat speeds are not restricted.  A  hiking trail runs to the north, crosses the Rio Chama Gorge via a pedestrian suspension bridge, and then connects to the Heron Lake State Park.

External links
 El Vado Lake State Park

Buildings and structures in Rio Arriba County, New Mexico
State parks of New Mexico
Parks in Rio Arriba County, New Mexico
Reservoirs in New Mexico
Lakes of Rio Arriba County, New Mexico